XHCUL-FM is a noncommercial social radio station broadcasting on 104.9 MHz in Culiacán, Sinaloa, Mexico. The station is owned by a non-profit foundation associated with Capital Media and carries a Spanish adult hits format known as Lokura FM. The station shares a transmitter site with XHNW-FM and XHFCS-FM in Culiacán.

History
On November 17, 2015, Fundación Radiodifusoras Capital Jalisco, A.C., applied for a new social radio station at Culiacán, which was approved by the Federal Telecommunications Institute on January 31, 2018.

The station signed on and began broadcasting El Heraldo Radio on November 10, 2020, from its initial transmitter site, co-sited with Radio Sinaloa in the center of Culiacán.

On April 1, 2022, Heraldo Radio dropped eight stations, including XHCUL; Capital then began operating it itself and flipped the station to its Lokura FM Spanish adult hits format.

In June, Roque Mascareño Chávez, owner of XHVQ-FM 96.9, launched a female talk format known as "La Bella" on XHCUL. The station was announced as part of the first anniversary of Chávez's Vibra Radio group.

References

Radio stations in Sinaloa
2020 establishments in Mexico
Radio stations established in 2020